Jack in the pulpit may refer to:

 Arum maculatum, a common woodland plant species widespread across temperate northern Europe
 Arisaema triphyllum, a herbaceous perennial plant native to eastern North America
 Cat's cradle, a well-known series of string figures created between two people as a game